Fuy may refer to:

 Fuy River, Chile
 Fuyug language (ISO 639: fuy)
 Puerto Fuy, Chile

See also
 Fui (disambiguation)